The 1989 Major League Baseball season saw the Oakland Athletics win their first World Series title since 1974.  

The American League saw the Oakland Athletics and the Toronto Blue Jays as the AL West and AL East pennant winners, respectively.  Oakland dominated the entire American League with their second straight season of more than 100 wins (including postseason wins) and looked to be a future dynasty. The Blue Jays, powered by their offense, won their pennant in the final weekend of the season.  The Chicago Cubs and San Francisco Giants stole the spotlight in the National League, but the Giants proved to be more dominant with a strong hitting presence.

Awards and honors
Baseball Hall of Fame
Al Barlick
Johnny Bench
Red Schoendienst
Carl Yastrzemski

Other awards
Outstanding Designated Hitter Award: Dave Parker (OAK)
Roberto Clemente Award (Humanitarian): Gary Carter (NYM).
Rolaids Relief Man Award: Jeff Russell (TEX, American); Mark Davis (SD, National).

Player of the Month

Pitcher of the Month

Statistical leaders

Standings

American League

National League

Postseason

Bracket

Managers

American League

National League

Home Field Attendance & Payroll

Television coverage

Events

January 9 – Johnny Bench and Carl Yastrzemski are elected to the Hall of Fame by the Baseball Writers' Association of America in their first year of eligibility. Bench was named on 96.4 percent of the ballots, the third-highest figure in history at the time behind Ty Cobb and Hank Aaron.
February 3 – Bill White, a former MLB player and broadcaster, was elected president of the National League. 
February 28 – Red Schoendienst, a former second baseman and manager of the St. Louis Cardinals, and Al Barlick, a National League umpire for 28 seasons, are elected to the Hall of Fame by the Special Veterans Committee.
April 3 – Outfielder Ken Griffey Jr. debuts with the Seattle Mariners and hits the first pitch he sees for a double (thrown by Dave Stewart of the Oakland Athletics). Griffey's father, Ken Griffey Sr., is still active with the Cincinnati Reds, making them the first father-son combination to play simultaneously in Major League Baseball (Griffey, Sr. would join the Mariners the following year, becoming first father/son combo playing in the same Major League game).
May 7 – Chicago mayor Richard M. Daley presides over the groundbreaking of the new Comiskey Park.
May 28 – George Bell ends the Toronto Blue Jays'  twelve-year stay at Exhibition Stadium with a walk-off home run to win the Jays' final game there with a 7–5 win over the Chicago White Sox, the same team the Jays' faced in their first game at Exhibition Stadium and in franchise history twelve years earlier.
May 29 – Mike Schmidt of the Philadelphia Phillies calls a press conference and tearfully announces his retirement, effective immediately.  Nonetheless, he will be voted to start the All-Star Game, and is permitted to appear in uniform.
June 3 – At the Astrodome, the Houston Astros and Los Angeles Dodgers engage in a 22-inning battle lasting seven hours and fourteen minutes, setting a new record for the longest night game in National League history. Houston's ace pitcher Mike Scott, never known for his batting abilities, surprises everyone by coming through with a walk-off sacrifice fly to give the Astros a 5–4 victory. Amazingly, the two teams meet again just hours later and wage another marathon, with Houston once again emerging victorious, 7–6 in 13 innings.
June 5 – Just eight days after leaving Exhibition Stadium, the Toronto Blue Jays inaugurate their brand-new home, SkyDome, the first Major League stadium with a fully retractable roof. As in the final game at Exhibition Stadium, George Bell hits a home run, but the Blue Jays fall to the Milwaukee Brewers, 5–3.
June 8 – At Veterans Stadium, the visiting Pittsburgh Pirates score 10 runs in the top of the first inning against the Philadelphia Phillies, three of which come on a Barry Bonds home run. As the Phillies come to bat in the bottom of the first, Pirate broadcaster Jim Rooker says on the air, "If we lose this game, I'll walk home." Both Von Hayes and Steve Jeltz hit two home runs to trigger the comeback for the Phillies, who finally tie the game in the 8th on a wild pitch, then take the lead on Darren Daulton's two-run single and go on to win 15–11. After the season, Rooker conducts a 300-plus-mile charity walk from Philadelphia to Pittsburgh.
June 27 – The Baltimore Orioles, managed by Frank Robinson, host the Toronto Blue Jays, helmed by Cito Gaston, at Memorial Stadium in the first Major League game featuring two black managers. The Orioles pound the Jays, 16–6.
July 4 – At Veterans Stadium, Cincinnati Reds pitcher Tom Browning, having already pitched a perfect game a year earlier, misses becoming the first pitcher in Major League history to throw two perfect games. Dickie Thon's leadoff double in the ninth breaks up this bid; Thon later scores on a Steve Jeltz single. John Franco then relieves Browning and induces Lenny Dykstra to hit into a game-ending double play for a 2–1 Reds victory.
July 5 – Mark McGwire of the Oakland Athletics hits his 100th career home run. However, the Kansas City Royals come out on top by a score of 12–9 in 11 innings.
July 11 – At Anaheim Stadium, Bo Jackson and Wade Boggs lead off the bottom of the first inning with back-to-back home runs off Rick Reuschel to spark the American League to a 5–3 win over the National League in the All-Star Game. Jackson earns MVP honors.
August 3 – The Cincinnati Reds set a Major League record for the most singles in an inning, with 12 in the 1st inning against the Houston Astros at Riverfront Stadium in an 18–2 victory.
August 4 – Dave Stieb, pitching for the Toronto Blue Jays, loses a perfect game with two outs in the ninth inning when Roberto Kelly of the New York Yankees doubles and later scores on a single by Steve Sax. Stieb wins a 2–1 two-hitter, but it is the third no-hitter that he has lost in the ninth inning in the past 11 months.
August 15 – San Francisco Giants pitcher Dave Dravecky, making a comeback from cancer in his deltoid muscle, snaps his humerus bone while throwing a pitch to Tim Raines in the sixth inning of a game against the Montreal Expos. The bone had been frozen as part of surgery for his cancer the previous year. Dravecky's cancer would return after the Giants' pennant win, forcing his retirement and the eventual amputation of his arm.
August 21 – Cal Ripken Jr. hits his 200th career home run, helping his Baltimore Orioles beat the Milwaukee Brewers, 5–0.
August 22 – Nolan Ryan of the Texas Rangers becomes the first (and so far only) pitcher in Major League history to record 5,000 career strikeouts. Ryan whiffs Rickey Henderson in the top of the fifth inning of an eventual 2–1 loss to the Oakland Athletics to reach the milestone.
August 23 – The Los Angeles Dodgers and Montreal Expos play a twenty-two inning game without a single base on balls, setting a Major League record which still stands.
August 24 – Commissioner A. Bartlett Giamatti announces in a press conference that Pete Rose is banned from baseball for life, in the wake of evidence that has come to light regarding Rose's gambling history.
September 1 – Commissioner A. Bartlett Giamatti unexpectedly dies of a heart attack.
September 14 – Jeff Reardon of the Minnesota Twins earns his 30th save of the season in a 2–0 win over the Toronto Blue Jays.  He becomes the first pitcher to save 30 games in five consecutive seasons.
September 26 – The Chicago Cubs clinch the National League East division title with a 3–2 win over the Expos in Montreal.
September 27 – The Oakland Athletics clinch their second straight American League West title with a 5–0 blanking of the Texas Rangers.
September 27 – Despite a 1–0 loss to the arch-rival Los Angeles Dodgers, the San Francisco Giants secure their second National League West crown in three years when the second-place San Diego Padres lose a 2–1 heartbreaker in 13 innings to the Cincinnati Reds.
September 30 – The Toronto Blue Jays win the American League East title with a narrow 4–3 victory over the Baltimore Orioles, whom they had overtaken for first place on September 1.
October 3 – Kirby Puckett wins an unlikely (at the time) American League batting title, taking advantage of an off-year by Boston's Wade Boggs due to marital issues.  Puckett clinches the title in Seattle on a double in the final game of the season, finishing with a final average of .339.
October 9 – After 43 years on the air, NBC concludes its run as the #1 over-the-air television broadcaster for Major League Baseball games. Game 5 of the NLCS between the San Francisco Giants and Chicago Cubs is the final baseball broadcast shown on the network (it would return to baseball broadcasting five years later, with the establishment of The Baseball Network).
October 17 – Game 3 of the World Series is postponed due to the Loma Prieta earthquake, which struck immediately before the game was set to begin.  It would be rescheduled for ten days later, on October 27.
October 28 – The Oakland Athletics complete a four-game sweep of the San Francisco Giants in the World Series, the first Series sweep since 1976. Oakland pitcher Dave Stewart, who won two games, is named MVP.  It is also the latest in the calendar year that a World Series game has ever been played up to this point; it was also the last MLB game broadcast by ABC for five years.
November 20 – Milwaukee Brewers outfielder Robin Yount is named American League MVP for the second time.  With his 1982 MVP Award coming in a year he played shortstop, he becomes the third player to win two such awards while playing different positions, after Hank Greenberg and Stan Musial.

Movies

Major League
Field of Dreams

Deaths
January 9 – Bill Terry, 90, Hall of Fame first baseman for the New York Giants who batted .341 lifetime and was the last National Leaguer to hit .400 (.401 in 1930); also managed Giants to 1933 World Series title
January 21 – Carl Furillo, 66, All-Star right fielder for the Dodgers who batted .300 five times and won 1953 batting title
January 22 – Willie Wells, 83, All-Star shortstop of the Negro leagues who combined batting power with excellent defense
January 23 – George Case, 73, All-Star outfielder for the Washington Senators who led the AL in stolen bases six times
February 17 – Lefty Gómez, 80, Hall of Fame pitcher for the New York Yankees who had four 20-win seasons and a .649 career winning percentage; led AL in strikeouts three times and in wins and ERA twice each, and was 6–0 in World Series
April 8 – Bus Saidt, 68, sportswriter who covered the Phillies, Mets and Yankees for the Trenton Times since 1967; previously a minor league broadcaster
April 16 – Jocko Conlan, 89, Hall of Fame umpire who worked in the National League from 1941 to 1964, including five World Series and six All-Star Games
May 17 – Specs Toporcer, 90, infielder for the Cardinals for eight seasons, and the first non-pitcher to wear eyeglasses; later a minor league manager
June 8 – Bibb Falk, 90, left fielder who batted .314 with White Sox and Indians; coached Texas to two College World Series titles
June 8 – Emil Verban, 73, All-Star second baseman for four NL teams who hit .412 in the 1944 World Series
June 15 – Judy Johnson, 89, Hall of Fame third baseman of the Negro leagues who became the major leagues' first black coach, and later a scout
July 18 – Donnie Moore, 35, All-Star relief pitcher who never overcame the disappointment from giving up a pivotal home run in the 1986 ALCS
August 17 – Fred Frankhouse, 85, All-Star pitcher for the Cardinals, Braves and Dodgers who ended Carl Hubbell's 24-game winning streak in 1937
August 30 – Joe Collins, 66, first baseman for the New York Yankees who hit four World Series homers
September 1 – A. Bartlett Giamatti, 51, commissioner of baseball since April, previously NL president since 1986, known for numerous writings on the sport as well as his banishment of Pete Rose

References

External links
1989 Major League Baseball season schedule at Baseball Reference

 
Major League Baseball seasons